Eden Park Standpipe is an ornate historic standpipe standing on the high ground of Eden Park in Cincinnati, Ohio. The standpipe is a form of water tower common in the late 19th century.  It was listed in the National Register on March 3, 1980.

It was built to provide sufficient water pressure for the neighborhood of Walnut Hills, Cincinnati. The standpipe held water pumped into it from the Ohio River by means of the neighboring Eden Park Station No. 7. Water flowed out of it into two  and one  mains. However, as the city grew ever outward and newer water towers were built, the old standpipe was rendered obsolete and it was discontinued from service in 1916. A public observation deck that once operated is no longer accessible to visitors.

A copper spire that adorned the turret was removed in 1943 for a war scrap drive. The structure is now used by the City as a communications tower.

References 

Towers in Ohio
Buildings and structures in Cincinnati
Water towers on the National Register of Historic Places
Infrastructure completed in 1894
National Register of Historic Places in Cincinnati
Victorian architecture in Ohio
Buildings and structures on the National Register of Historic Places in Ohio
1894 establishments in Ohio
Water towers in the United States